Heinz Wengler (27 September 1912 – 1 October 1942) was a German professional road bicycle racer. In 1937, he won one stage of the 1937 Tour de France, joint with Adolphe Braeckeveldt. Wengler was killed in action at the Eastern Front in 1942.

Major results
1937
Tour de France:
Winner stage 17B (ex aequo with Adolph Braeckeveldt)

External links 

Official Tour de France results for Heinz Wengler

1912 births
1942 deaths
German male cyclists
German Tour de France stage winners
Sportspeople from Bielefeld
People from the Province of Westphalia
German military personnel killed in World War II
Cyclists from North Rhine-Westphalia
Military personnel from Bielefeld